Anok Yai (born December 20, 1997) is an American fashion model of South Sudanese heritage. She is the second black model after Naomi Campbell, and the first South Sudanese woman, to open a Prada show. Yai currently ranks as one of the "Top 50" models by models.com.

Early life
She was born in Cairo and her family moved to Manchester, New Hampshire when she was 3. Her mother is a nurse and her father works for Easterseals; her sister Alim is her manager and a financial consultant. She graduated from Manchester High School West and attends Plymouth State University studying biochemistry, intending to become a doctor.

Career
Yai was discovered in October 2017 during Howard University's homecoming week, by a professional photographer Steve 'theSUNK' Hall who asked to take her picture. He posted the photo on Instagram, accruing over 20,000 likes, and modeling agencies, including IMG Models, asked to get in touch with her. She eventually chose to sign with Next Model Management, who had called her daily for several weeks. Within 4 months, she became the first Sudanese model to open a Prada fashion show, which is deemed the highest feat in fashion modeling because of the careers Prada has launched. She has also appeared in the Prada SS 2018 campaign and an upcoming Nike campaign designed by Givenchy's Riccardo Tisci.

On her breakthrough moment, she told Vogue

"It was an honor and I'm proud that I was the one chosen to open, but this is bigger than me. Me opening for one of the top fashion houses is a statement to the world - especially for black women - that their beauty is something that deserves to be celebrated."

In July 2018, Yai became an Estée Lauder spokes model.

In 2019, she was featured on the cover of Vogue Japan and in 2020, she was featured on the cover of Vogue Netherlands and Vogue Germany. In September 2021, she appeared on the cover of Vogue along with other models including Ariel Nicholson, Bella Hadid, and Kaia Gerber. In February 2022, she appeared on the cover of British Vogue with all black models.

In 2023, Yai appeared the music video for Lil Yachty's song "sAy sOMTHINg". She opened her first Mugler Couture show and during Paris Fashion Week, walked for high-luxury brands such as Off-White, Valentino and Fendi.

Filmography

References 

1997 births
Living people
Egyptian emigrants to the United States
American people of South Sudanese descent
Plymouth State University alumni
American female models
People from Manchester, New Hampshire
African-American female models
People with acquired American citizenship
Next Management models
South Sudanese female models
21st-century African-American people
21st-century African-American women
Prada exclusive models